Viorel Moiceanu (born 5 July 1954) is a Romanian former football forward.

Honours
Argeș Pitești
Divizia A: 1978–79

References

1954 births
Living people
Romanian footballers
Association football forwards
Liga I players
Liga II players
FC Dacia Pitești players
FC Argeș Pitești players